Team Phoenix may refer to:

Phoenix Racing (German racing team) (established 1999), German motor racing team
Team Phoenix F.C. (established 2017), a Burmese football club
Team Phoenix True Crime YouTube (established March 2019), a true crime & victim advocacy community